Carobbiite, chemical formula KF (potassium fluoride), is a rare, soft (Mohs 2 - 2.5), colourless cubic mineral. It is found at Monte Somma, Somma-Vesuvius Complex, Province of Naples, Campania, Italy. It was discovered in 1956 by Italian geologist Guido Carobbi (1900–1983). It has also been reported from Hokkaido, Japan.

References

Potassium minerals
Fluorine minerals
Cubic minerals
Minerals in space group 225
Rocksalt group